Jonathan Elliot may refer to:

 Jonathan Elliot (historian) (1784–1846), American historian
 Jonathan Elliot, Superman character; see Superman: Whatever Happened to the Man of Tomorrow?
 Jon Elliott (born 1947), American radio presenter

See also 
 John Elliot (disambiguation)